The Werribee railway line is a commuter rail passenger train service in Melbourne, Australia, operating between Werribee in the western suburbs to Flinders Street in the central business district. The line traverses the flat plains of Melbourne's western suburbs, and after leaving Footscray, has no significant earthworks. The area around the outer end of the line has seen significant residential growth in recent years, resulting in strong patronage growth. It is part of the Melbourne metropolitan rail network operated by Metro Trains.

Infrastructure
The Werribee line consists of multiple tracks, shared with other lines, from the City Loop until South Kensington, after which it becomes double track. From Newport South Junction, which is about  after Newport, the two tracks are signalled for bi-directional operation, although it is very rare for trains to use the possibility of right-hand running. About one and a half kilometres from Newport South, the Altona branch diverges at Altona Junction. It is a single-track branch, apart from a passing loop at Westona, and rejoins the main line at Laverton.

Automatic block signalling applies to Newport South, situated at the Champion Road level crossing, and from Newport South through to Werribee (and then all the way to Geelong), the line is controlled by automatic and track control safeworking, both via Westona and the main line. Terminating facilities for trains are provided at Newport and Laverton. Newport is also the location of the Newport Workshops, formerly the main workshops of the Victorian Railways. Stabling facilities for suburban trains are provided at Newport Workshops, and trains are also stabled overnight in the platform at Werribee.

Next generation passenger information display screens (PIDS) have been installed at most stations along the Werribee Line, apart from South Kensington, Aircraft and Spotswood.

Services 
There are 2 predominant stopping patterns on the Werribee Line, Local and Express. All services travel direct to and from Flinders Street and do not use the City Loop.

Local (stopping all stations) 
Trains stop at all stations on the Werribee Line. Combined with stopping all stations trains on the Williamstown line, stations between Newport and Flinders Street have double frequency (Trains every 10 minutes) during the day. The average journey time from Flinders Street to Laverton is 35 minutes, and to Werribee is about 47-50 minutes.

Express 
Operates in both directions during the daytime and peak hours on weekdays. Trains stop at Flinders Street, Southern Cross, North Melbourne, Footscray, Newport, Laverton, and all stations between Laverton and Werribee. The average journey time between Flinders Street and Werribee for limited express trains is around 37-39 minutes.

Station List  
Legend - Stations

 ◼ Premium station - Station staffed from first to last train
 ◻ Host station - Usually staffed during morning peak, however this can vary for different stations on the network.

Legend - Stopping Patterns

 ● - All trains stop
 | - Trains pass

Note:

 Certain trains operate with altered stopping patterns or may terminate and start at intermediate stations
Weekend night network trains do not stop at Southern Cross

Rolling Stock 

All trains are operated as 6 car trains.

X'Trapolis 100
Siemens Nexas
Comeng

History

Early in 1857, the Geelong and Melbourne Railway Company opened the Werribee to Little River section of the line they were building between Newport and Geelong, then in June of that year, opened the section between Werribee and a temporary station near Newport, known as Greenwich. The intention was to connect to the Williamstown line being built by the Melbourne, Mount Alexander and Murray River Railway Company, with whom they had arranged permission to run the former company's trains over the latter company's tracks to Melbourne, but the Williamstown line was not yet ready.

However, by October 1857, construction of the Williamstown line was sufficiently advanced to allow the Geelong trains to run to the terminus at Williamstown Pier, so Greenwich was closed and a connection was made to the Williamstown line towards Williamstown. From Williamstown Pier, passengers could connect to a ferry across Hobsons Bay to Port Melbourne.

The Williamstown line opened in January 1859, so the connection near Newport towards Williamstown was removed and replaced with a connection to Newport, and through running of Geelong trains to Melbourne commenced.

In April 1885, a short branch was opened off the Werribee line just past Newport to Williamstown Racecourse, and in November 1888, a branch was opened off the Racecourse branch to Altona, terminating at a station named Altona Beach. This branch was opened by the Altona and Laverton Bay Freehold and Investment Co. Ltd. in order to encourage people to buy their land in the area. However, the line closed less than two years later, in August 1890.

A portion of the Altona Beach line near Williamstown Racecourse was leased by the Victorian Railways (VR) in 1906 to store race trains, and sometime between 1911 and 1919, the line must have been reopened for goods trains, as a siding was built from Altona Beach to the Melbourne and Altona Colliery Co. mine. From November 1917, the VR worked the line on behalf of the then owners, Altona Beach Estates Ltd., but to a relocated Altona Beach station, short of the original terminus.

The VR electrified the Williamstown line and the branch to Williamstown Racecourse in August 1920. In October 1924 the VR took total control of the Altona Beach line, and electrified it in October 1926.

Automatic Block Signalling was commissioned between South Kensington and Yarraville in August 1927, and then on to Newport. The Automatic and Track Control system was installed from Newport South towards Geelong, enabling bidirectional use of the then single track line.

The Williamstown Racecourse branch closed in May 1950.

Duplication of the Werribee line occurred in the 1960s, the first section being between a crossing loop named Rock Loop and Laverton in May 1965, followed by Newport B Box to Rock Loop in October 1967, and Laverton to Werribee in September 1968. The Altona branch was converted to Automatic Block Signalling in October 1967.

First announced by the then Transport Minister, Joe Rafferty in 1977, electrification was extended from Altona Junction to Werribee in September 1983, whilst in January 1985, the Altona line was extended to Westona. In April 1985, Altona to Westona, which had temporarily been operated by Staff and Ticket safeworking, was converted to Automatic and Track Control, and a few days later, the line was extended to Laverton on the Werribee line. Initially almost every Werribee suburban train ran via Westona, but a complete timetable re-write in May 2011 has seen this section converted to a separate service most of the time. The 2011 timetable rewrite introduced the controversial practice of having Altona Loop trains run as a shuttle between Laverton and Newport during off peak hours. The shuttle was finally ended in August 2017, with direct services to and from the city being reinstated to the Altona Loop.

Up until June 2015, Geelong and Warrnambool Line services ran on the Werribee Line to Southern Cross. These V/Line service stopped at Werribee, Newport and North Melbourne before arriving at Southern Cross. With the completion of the Regional Rail Link, Geelong and Warrnambool services were rerouted through 90 km of new track constructed in West Werribee. Separating suburban and regional trains has reduced overcrowding, increased capacity for new services and improved service reliability on the Werribee Line. A new bus link was introduced which linked Werribee station with Geelong trains at Wyndham Vale station. However, the Werribee line is still available to be used by V/Line services in special circumstances should the Regional Rail Link lines be closed.

The January 2021 timetable rewrite removed all Werribee line services from the City Loop. Trains now run direct to Flinders Street. Peak hour frequencies were also made more consistent for the Altona Loop. 

As part of stage 1 of Western Rail Plan's Geelong Fast Rail, track upgrades between Werribee and Laverton stations and upgrades to both stations are being planned. Construction will begin in 2023. The upgrades include a new dedicated express track for Geelong services, which will resume running via the Werribee line when the project is completed.

Level crossing removals 
As part of the Level Crossing Removal Authority's (LXRA's) Western Package, 5 level crossings along the Werribee Line were earmarked for removal. The crossings have been removed and were:

 Kororoit Creek Road, Williamstown North (completed July 2018)
 Aviation Road, Laverton (completed September 2019)
 Old Geelong Road, Hoppers Crossing (completed December 2021)
 Cherry Street, Werribee (completed March 2021)
 Werribee Street, Werribee (completed January 2021)

Kororoit Creek Road

The Altona Loop section of the Werribee Line intersects Kororoit Creek Road in Williamstown North. The crossing is located in an industrial area. A rail bridge was constructed over the roadway, allowing trains to pass overhead. The project scope also included partial duplication of the Altona Loop, allowing trains to pass on the Altona Loop without affecting the main line. The crossing was fully removed by July 2018.

Aviation Road

Prior to removal, the Werribee Line intersected Aviation Road on the citybound side of Aircraft station. The crossing created significant delays during peak hours as it intersected a roundabout which connected Aircraft Village, Laverton North and the Princes Freeway (M1).

The Aviation Road level crossing was removed using a road bridge which raised the road above the tracks. The new road bridge improved connectivity between Laverton North, Aircraft Village and the adjacent RAAF base. Bike lanes have also been provided on the rail bridge. The project was completed by the end of September 2019, months ahead of schedule.

The Level Crossing Removal Authority will also partially rebuild Aircraft station in the future when removing the other 3 crossings on the Werribee line. This is to minimise disruption to train services. Planned improvements include the redesign of the station forecourt, construction of a new pedestrian underpass which will connect the forecourt to the platforms, and the RAAF base.

Old Geelong Road

A road bridge was constructed to separate Old Geelong Road from the rail line, 700 metres to the east of the crossing. The new bridge included the demolition of the small car yard and the Monte Villa Motor Inn. Hoppers Crossing Station was also upgraded with a pedestrian overpass. The bridge opened to traffic and the crossing was removed on 9 December 2021.

Cherry Street

Constructing a road bridge was the preferred option for removing the crossing. The bridge was constructed  to the east between Tarneit Road and Princes Highway. The bridge opened to traffic and the crossing was removed in March 2021.

Werribee Street

The Werribee Street level crossing was removed using a rail bridge in January 2021.

References

External links
 Statistics and detailed schematic map at the VicSig enthusiast website
History of the Geelong line (of which the Werribee line is a subset)

Further reading 
 The Altona Line Lyell, A.R. Australian Railway Historical Society Bulletin, July, 1959, pp. 97–100

Railway lines in Melbourne
Railway lines opened in 1859
1859 establishments in Australia
Werribee, Victoria
Public transport routes in the City of Melbourne (LGA)
Transport in the City of Wyndham
Transport in the City of Maribyrnong
1500 V DC railway electrification